Heinrich Carl Franz Emil Timerding (23 January 1873 in Strasbourg – 30 April 1945 in Braunschweig) was a German mathematician, professor at the Braunschweig University of Technology, mainly known for his contributions to probability theory.
He was awarded the Brunswick and the Prussian War Merit Cross, the Ritterkreuz (Knight's Cross) of the Order of Henry the Lion, and in 1938 the Nazi Civil Service Faithful Service Medal.

In 1900 he attended at Columbia University in New York City the American Mathematical Society's summer meeting, where he read a paper.

Main publications
 Über die Kugeln, welche eine cubische Raumcurve mehrfach oder mehrpunktig berühren. R. Schultz & co, Strassburg 1894
 Geometrie der Kräfte, Teubner, Leipzig 1908
 Die Erziehung der Anschauung, Teubner, Leipzig, 1912
 Handbuch der angewandten Mathematik Vol. 1. Praktische Analysis.  Vol. 2. Darstellende Geometrie., Teubner 1914
 Analyse des Zufalls, 1915
 Der goldene Schnitt, 1919
  Robert Mayer und die Entdeckung des Energiegesetzes, 1925.

References
 One Hundred Years of l’Enseignement Mathematique, Moments of Mathematics Education in the Twentieth Century, Geneva 2003 
 Walter Kertz, Technische Universität Braunschweig vom Collegium Carolinum zur Technischen Universität 1745 – 1995, Hildesheim 1995 
 Wolfgang Schneider, Die Technische Hochschule Braunschweig; Länderdienst, Verlag Berlin-West, Basel 1963
 Anders Hald, A history of mathematical statistics from 1750 to 1930, 1998

External links
 
 

1873 births
1945 deaths
Scientists from Strasbourg
19th-century German mathematicians
20th-century German mathematicians
Academic staff of the Technical University of Braunschweig
People from Alsace-Lorraine